Lake Boya is a small lake about  east of Kabongo in Katanga Province of the Democratic Republic of the Congo.
The lake is surrounded by high reeds, and has a thriving population of birds.

In the pre-colonial period the region around Lake Boya was a center of inter-regional trade, an important source of wealth for the Kingdom of Luba.
The king and conqueror Kongolo established his capital near Lake Boya at Mwimbele at the start of the sixteenth century.

References

Sources

Nzilo